In Russian, blat is a form of corruption comprising a system of informal agreements, exchanges of services, connections, Party contacts, or black market deals to achieve results or get ahead.

In the USSR, blat was widespread because of the permanent shortage of consumer goods and services. This was due to the price of consumer goods being dictated by the state rather than set by the free market. Networks of blat made it easier for the general public to gain access to much-coveted goods and services. Blat also took place at the enterprise-level in the form of tolkachs, employees whose explicit role was to exploit their networks to secure positive outcomes for their employers.

The system of blat can be seen as an example of a social network with some similarities to networking (especially "good ol' boy" networks) in the United States, old boy networks in the United Kingdom and the former British Empire, and guanxi in China.

In practice 
While certain official privileges would be provided to citizens depending on status (as a party official, member of the intelligentsia, factory worker, or toiling peasant), access was by no means guaranteed even for the upper echelon, as "commodities like dachas and housing in a ministerial apartment block were in extremely short supply, and mere membership in the eligible group was not enough to secure the prize. To get privileges, [one] needed contacts with somebody higher up; in short, [one] needed a patron."

An example of such patronage was depicted in a fantasy sketch by the writer Mikhail Bulgakov:
Motorcycle.... brrm!!! In the Kremlin already! Misha goes into the hall, and there sit Stalin, Molotov, Voroshilov, Kaganovich, Mikoyan and Iagoda.
Misha stands in the door, making a low bow.
STALIN: What's the matter? Why are you barefoot?
BULGAKOV (with a sad shrug): Well... I don't have any boots...
STALIN: What is this? My writer going without boots? What an outrage! Iagoda, take off your boots, give them to him.
Another notable operation of blat system was the institution of tolkachs. In the Soviet Union, the Gosplan was not able to calculate efficient or even feasible plans, so enterprises often had to rely on people with connections, who could then use blat to help fulfill quotas. Eventually most enterprises came to have a dedicated supply specialist – a tolkach (literally "pusher") – to perform this task.

Usage
Blat was primarily used to describe networks in which people made favors in exchange for other favors. Its adverbial usage is po blatu, meaning "by or via blat".

According to Max Vasmer, the origin of the word blat is the Yiddish blatt, meaning a "blank note" or a "list". However, according to both Vasmer and N. M. Shansky, blat may also have entered into Russian as the Polish loanword blat, a noun signifying "someone who provides an umbrella" or a "cover". The word became part of Imperial Russian criminal slang in the early 20th century, where it signified relatively minor criminal activity such as petty theft.

A similar term, protektsiya, literally means "protection", but with more emphasis on patronage. Another semantically related term, krysha, is derived from the criminal environment and literally means "a roof".

The noun blatnoy (блатной) has an explicitly criminal meaning in Russian. It usually refers to a member of a thief gang – blatnoy itself means "professional criminal". The term originally meant "one possessing the correct paperwork", which, in the corrupt officialdom of Imperial Russia and the Soviet Union, indicated that the blatnoy was well connected. It later came to indicate career criminals because they had a blatnoy, or special status, in the Russian criminal underworld. The word is used to indicate association with the criminal underworld (e.g. "blatnoy language"/Fenya, "blatnoy behavior", "blatnoy outlook").

See also
 Compadrazgo – a similar phenomenon in Latin America
 Guanxi – a similar phenomenon in China
 Sociolismo – a similar phenomenon in Communist-run Cuba
 System D – a more or less similar concept of informality from European French
 Reciprocity – generalized concept used by anthropologists
 Social capital
 Cronyism
 Nepotism
 Old boy network
 The Blonde Around the Corner – a Soviet 1984 film, which illustrates the concept
 You to Me, Me to You – a Soviet 1976 film, which illustrates the concept
 Blatnaya pesnya – "criminals' song", Russian musical genre influenced by the criminal underworld
 Sistema (Russian politics)

References

Further reading
 Shelia Fitzpatrick. Everyday Stalinism: ordinary life in extraordinary times; Soviet Russia in the 1930s. Oxford University Press 2000. ; 
 Prison casts of Russia
 Velez‐Calle, A., Robledo‐Ardila, C., & Rodriguez‐Rios, J. D. (2015). On the influence of interpersonal relations on business practices in Latin America: A comparison with the Chinese guanxi and the Arab Wasta. Thunderbird International Business Review, 57(4), 281–293.

Society of Russia
Society of the Soviet Union
Corruption in Russia
Second economy of the Soviet Union
Russian slang
Organized crime terminology